7-Nitroindazole, or 7-NI, is a heterocyclic small molecule containing an indazole ring that has been nitrated at the 7 position.  Nitroindazole acts as a selective inhibitor for neuronal nitric oxide synthase, a hemoprotein enzyme that, in neuronal tissue, converts arginine to citrulline and nitric oxide (NO). Nitric oxide can diffuse through the plasma membrane into neighbouring cells, allowing cell signalling, so nitroindazole indirectly inhibits this signalling process. Other inhibitors exist such as 3-bromo-7-nitroindazole, which is more potent but less specific, or NPA (N-propyl-L-arginine), which acts on a different site.

Pharmacology
7-Nitroindazole is under investigation as a possible protective agent against nerve damage caused by excitotoxicity or neurodegenerative diseases. It may act by reducing oxidative stress or by decreasing the amount of peroxynitrite formed in these tissues.  These effects are related to the inhibition of type 1 nitric oxide synthase.  However, anticonvulsive effect is derived from some other mechanisms.

See also
 Dizocilpine (MK-801) a non-competitive antagonist of the NMDA receptor
 Sildenafil a drug for impotence, which inhibits cGMP specific phosphodiesterase type 5 (PDE5), which is responsible for degradation of cGMP, which is produced by guanylate cyclase, which is activated by nitric oxide produced by eNOS
 tetrahydrobiopterin, cofactor to several enzymes including nitric oxide synthase (NOS)
 protein kinase A (PKA) and protein kinase C (PKC)

References

External links
 

Nitro compounds
Oxidoreductase inhibitors
Indazoles